Birdman or birdmen may refer to:

Flying
 Avian humanoid, a person with avian characteristics in mythology, folklore, and popular fiction
 Birdman, a wingsuit flying parachutist
 Birdman Rally, a competition where people attempt to fly with home-made contraptions
 International Birdman, the original Birdman rally

Business
 Birdman Enterprises, a Canadian aircraft manufacturer from 1973 to 1987
 Birdman Aircraft, an American ultralight manufacturer in the 1970s and early 80s
 Birdman, a brand of wingsuits owned by Jari Kuosma

Arts and entertainment

Music
 Birdman Records, an independent music label
 "Birdman", a 1970 song by Ian McDonald and Michael Giles from the album McDonald and Giles
 "Birdmen", a 1982 song by Felt from the album Crumbling the Antiseptic Beauty
 "Birdman", a 1994 song by Ride from the album Carnival of Light
 "The Birdman" (song), a 1994 song by Our Lady Peace
 Birdman (album), a 2002 album by Birdman, then known as Baby
 Birdman (film score), a soundtrack album from the 2014 film
 "Jean the Birdman", 1993 music video

Film and television
 Birdman (film), a 2014 film by Alejandro González Iñárritu
 The Bird Men (former name The Birder), a 2013 film starring Fred Willard
 Harvey Birdman, a fictional Hanna-Barbera character
 Birdman and the Galaxy Trio
 Harvey Birdman, Attorney at Law
 Birdperson, a character in the television series Rick and Morty

Comics and literature
 Birdman and Chicken, 1970s British comic strip 
 Bird-Man, the alias shared by three villainous Marvel Comics characters
 Birdmen (manga), a 2013 manga series by Yellow Tanabe
 Birdman (novel), a 2000 novel by Mo Hayder
 Birdman, a character in Fujiko F. Fujio's manga Perman

People
 Chris Andersen (born 1978), American retired basketball player nicknamed "The Birdman"
 Lincoln Beachey (1887–1915), American pioneering aviator sometimes called the "Master Birdman"
 Birdman (rapper) (born 1969), stage name for American rapper Bryan Williams
 Brett Burton (born 1978), Australian Rules Footballer for the Adelaide Crows 
 Tony Hawk (born 1968), American skateboarder nicknamed "The Birdman"
 Albin K. Longren (1882–1950), American aviation pioneer
 Robert Stroud (1890–1963), the "Birdman of Alcatraz", American prisoner and author famous for raising birds
 Koko B. Ware (James Ware, born 1957), American professional wrestler

Other uses
 Tangata manu (literally "the bird-man"), the winner of a ritual competition on Easter Island
 Birdman burial, an elaborate elite personage burial from the Mound 72 archaeological site at Cahokia
 Birdman, the avian themed dancing warrior from artwork connected to the Southeastern Ceremonial Complex

See also
 Junior Birdmen, a former boys club in the US
 Bird Man (urban legend)
 Bird people (disambiguation)
 Hawkman (disambiguation)
 Wingman (disambiguation)